Charalambos Cholidis (1 October 1956 – 26 June 2019) was a Greek wrestler who competed, in the 1976 Summer Olympics, 1980 Summer Olympics, 1984 Summer Olympics and in the 1988 Summer Olympics. He was born in Guryev, Kazakh SSR and died in Athens. He was named the 1978, 1983, and 1988 Greek Male Athlete of the Year.

References

External links
 

1956 births
2019 deaths
People from Atyrau
Pontic Greeks
Olympic wrestlers of Greece
Wrestlers at the 1976 Summer Olympics
Wrestlers at the 1980 Summer Olympics
Wrestlers at the 1984 Summer Olympics
Wrestlers at the 1988 Summer Olympics
Greek male sport wrestlers
Olympic bronze medalists for Greece
Olympic medalists in wrestling
Kazakhstani people of Greek descent
Soviet people of Greek descent
Soviet emigrants to Greece
Kazakhstani emigrants to Greece
Medalists at the 1988 Summer Olympics
Medalists at the 1984 Summer Olympics
20th-century Greek people